In ½ h (meaning "in half an hour", which is the running length) is an Italian television talk show hosted by the Italian journalist Lucia Annunziata and is broadcast on Rai Tre every Sunday since 2005 and re-broadcast on Raisat Extra.

RAI original programming
Italian television talk shows
Current affairs shows
2005 Italian television series debuts
2000s Italian television series
2010s Italian television series